Chester State Park is located near the town of Chester in Chester County, South Carolina. The  park was developed by the Civilian Conservation Corps on land purchased in 1935.

Jon boat & canoe rentals are popular in the warmer months, and the park also offers a boat ramp for visitors with electric or hand-powered personal boats. Picnicking, rental picnic shelters and a large playground system are located along the shoreline. As of November 16, 2013, Chester State Park also offers the first SC State Park tournament sanctioned disc golf course. This 27 hole course has three loops suitable for professional, tournament play with 18 of these holes having alternative tee's for beginner/amateur level players.

Lakeview Hall, a fully enclosed meeting facility overlooking the park lake, is regularly used for weddings, reunions, and corporate meetings. Boy Scouts, church groups, and many other organized groups frequent the primitive group camping area throughout the year. Chester State Park's 25-site campground is open year-round and has many sites that may accommodate anything from single tents to  RVs.

See also
 List of South Carolina state parks

External links
Official website
Caney Fork Falls
 Chester Disc Golf Review

References

State parks of South Carolina
Protected areas of Chester County, South Carolina
Civilian Conservation Corps in South Carolina